Hollingsworth "Worth" McMillion (October 6, 1926 – June 5, 2015) was a NASCAR Grand National driver who participated from 1962 to 1969 for 62 races.

Career
His first event was the 1962 untitled race at South Boston Speedway while his final event was the 1969 Richmond 500. McMillion has finished in the top-five once, and eighteen times in the top ten. While McMillion had raced in 16161 laps, he was the leader in none of them. His average start was 24th place while his average finish was in 14th place.

From 1962 to 1965, McMillion was a driver/owner. Starting in 1965, Worth McMillion drove for other owners like Allen McMillion and Roy Tyner. Most of his races were done in Pontiac vehicles (either in a 1962 Pontiac Catalina or in 1964 generic Pontiac vehicle) while two races would have him use a generic 1962 Chevrolet vehicle. The most money that McMillion has ever earned in a race was at the 1964 World 600 at Charlotte Motor Speedway. He would earn $1,200 ($ when considering inflation) for his 14th-place finish after starting in 37th place (out of 44 qualifying drivers).

Motorsports career results

NASCAR
(key) (Bold – Pole position awarded by qualifying time. Italics – Pole position earned by points standings or practice time. * – Most laps led.)

Grand National Series

References

External links
 
 

1926 births
2015 deaths
NASCAR drivers
NASCAR team owners
People from Amelia, Virginia
Racing drivers from Virginia